Stephen Famewo (born 30 December 1983) is a Nigerian-German former professional footballer who played as a midfielder or forward.

References

External links

1983 births
Living people
German sportspeople of Nigerian descent
Nigerian footballers
Association football midfielders
Association football forwards
2. Bundesliga players
Eintracht Frankfurt II players
Eintracht Frankfurt players
VfB Stuttgart II players
SV Wehen Wiesbaden players
SV Wilhelmshaven players
Holstein Kiel players
Kickers Emden players
SV Meppen players
FC 08 Homburg players